Darío Poveda Romera (born 13 March 1997) is a Spanish footballer who plays as a forward for FC Cartagena, on loan from Getafe CF.

Club career
Born in San Vicente del Raspeig, Alicante, Valencian Community, Poveda joined Villarreal CF's youth setup in 2008, aged 11. He made his senior debut with the C-team on 13 March 2016, coming on as a late substitute and scoring the last in a 5–2 home routing of UD Benigànim in the Tercera División.

On 21 August 2016, Poveda made his debut with the reserves in a 0–1 Segunda División B away loss against UE Cornellà. He was definitely promoted to the B-side the following 30 May, after scoring 14 goals for the C-team.

On 21 August 2017, Poveda made his first-team – and La Liga – debut, replacing Manu Trigueros in a 0–1 loss at Levante UD. The following 23 July, he moved to another reserve team, Atlético Madrid B also in the third division.

Poveda made his first-team debut for Atleti on 23 November 2019, playing the last eight minutes of a 1–1 away draw against Granada CF. On 31 August of the following year, he moved to fellow top tier side Getafe CF on a season-long loan deal.

In June 2021, despite only playing five minutes for Getafe, Poveda signed a permanent five-year contract with the club. He scored his first goal in the top tier on 19 December, netting a last-minute winner in a 1–0 home success over CA Osasuna.

On 25 January 2022, Poveda was loaned to Segunda División side SD Huesca until the end of the campaign. On 5 July, he moved to fellow league team UD Ibiza also in a temporary deal.

On 19 January 2023, Poveda's loan with Ibiza was terminated, and he moved to fellow second division side FC Cartagena on loan for the remainder of the season.

Career statistics

Club

References

External links

1997 births
Living people
People from Alacantí
Sportspeople from the Province of Alicante
Footballers from the Valencian Community
Spanish footballers
Association football forwards
La Liga players
Segunda División B players
Tercera División players
Villarreal CF C players
Villarreal CF B players
Villarreal CF players
Atlético Madrid B players
Atlético Madrid footballers
Getafe CF footballers
SD Huesca footballers
UD Ibiza players
FC Cartagena footballers
Spain youth international footballers